Danube Cossacks may refer to either:
the Danubian Sich (an exiled Zaporozhian Cossack Host which lived in the Ottoman Controlled Danube 1778-1828)
the Danube Cossack Host (A Russian Cossack Host that lived in the Budjak Territory from 1828 to 1868)